Channelopathies are a group of diseases caused by the dysfunction of ion channel subunits or their interacting proteins. These diseases can be inherited or acquired by other disorders, drugs, or toxins. Mutations in genes encoding ion channels, which impair channel function, are the most common cause of channelopathies. There are more than 400 genes that encode ion channels, found in all human cell types and are involved in almost all physiological processes. Each type of channel is a multimeric complex of subunits encoded by a number of genes. Depending where the mutation occurs it may affect the gating, conductance, ion selectivity, or signal transduction of the channel.

Channelopathies can be categorized based on the organ system which they are associated with. In the cardiovascular system, the electrical impulse needed for each heartbeat is made possible by the electrochemical gradient of each heart cell. Because the heartbeat is dependent on the proper movement of ions across the surface membrane, cardiac channelopathies make up a key group of heart diseases. Long QT syndrome, the most common form of cardiac channelopathy, is characterized by prolonged ventricular repolarization, predisposing to a high risk of ventricular tachyarrhythmias (e.g., torsade de pointes), syncope, and sudden cardiac death.

The channelopathies of human skeletal muscle include hyper- and hypokalemic (high and low  potassium blood concentrations) periodic paralysis, myotonia congenita and paramyotonia congenita.

Channelopathies affecting synaptic function are a type of synaptopathy.

Causes

Genetic type 
Mutations in genes encoding ion channels, which cause defects in channel function, are the most common cause of channelopathies.

Acquired type 
Acquired channelopathies are caused by acquired disorders, drug use, toxins, etc.

Types 

The types in the following table are commonly accepted. Channelopathies currently under research, like Kir4.1 potassium channel in multiple sclerosis, are not included.

References

Bibliography

External links 

VIDEO Channel Surfing in Pediatrics by Carl E. Stafstrom, M.D., at the UW-Madison Health Sciences Learning Center.
 
 The Channelopathy Foundation - Foundation for Ion Channel diseases
 Cystic Fibrosis Foundation
 Rare Diseases Clinical Research Network